Eads or EADS may refer to:

People
 Christine Eads, American radio host
 George Eads (born 1967), American actor
 George C. Eads (born 1942), American economist
 James Buchanan Eads (1820–1887), American engineer and inventor
 Joshua Allen Eads (born 1984), American drag queen known as Ginger Minj
 Lance Eads (born 1968), American politician
 Lucy Tayiah Eads (1888–1961), Native American chief
 Robert Eads (1945–1999), American trans man
 Wendell Eads (1923–1997), American jockey

Places
United States
 Eads, Colorado
 Eads, Tennessee

Other uses 
 Eastern Air Defense Sector, a United States Air Force Air Combat Command
 European Aeronautic Defence and Space Company, now Airbus

See also 
 EAD (disambiguation)